The orange-eyed flatbill or orange-eyed flycatcher (Tolmomyias traylori) is a species of bird in the family Tyrannidae. It is found in the Amazon (specifically in várzea forest) in south-eastern Colombia, eastern Ecuador, and north-eastern Peru. First recognized as a species due to its distinct voice, it was only described in 1997; the binomial commemorates the American ornithologist Melvin Alvah Traylor Jr. The International Union for Conservation of Nature has rated the conservation status of this species as being of  "least concern".

Description
It has olive upper parts and a greyish crown. The facial area, throat and chest are greyish-buff and the belly yellowish. The iris is orange, and this and the buff throat is distinctive and helps distinguish this bird from other species in the genus. The song is a series of five to seven notes "zhreee", more extended and more rasping than the yellow-breasted flatbill (Tolmomyias flaviventris). The flatbills in this genus are difficult to tell apart and are most easily recognised by their song.

Distribution and habitat
The orange-eyed flatbill is found in northwestern Amazonia, its range extending from southeastern Colombia, through eastern Ecuador to northeastern Peru. It appears to replace the yellow-olive flatbill (Tolmomyias sulphurescens) to the north of the Amazon River and is also present on large islands in the river. It favours the mid-storey of moderately-high and tall, seasonally-flooded Várzea forest. It is usually seen by itself or in pairs, and seldom joins mixed flocks. Like other members of the genus, the bag-shaped nest has a tubular entrance near the base and is often hung near a wasp nest.

Status
The orange-eyed flatbill has a very wide range in western Amazonia and is an uncommon species. The population trend is unknown, but the bird is likely to be declining due to deforestation in the area. Nevertheless, the rate of decline is insufficient for the trend to approach the threshold criteria for rating the bird as "vulnerable", so the International Union for Conservation of Nature has rated it as being a "least-concern species".

References

External links
Xeno-canto: audio recordings of the orange-eyed flatbill

orange-eyed flatbill
Birds of the Ecuadorian Amazon
Birds of the Peruvian Amazon
orange-eyed flatbill
Taxonomy articles created by Polbot